The governor of Puebla is the chief executive of the Mexican state of Puebla.

References

Puebla